The 1955 Claxton Shield was the 16th annual Claxton Shield, and was held in Sydney. The participants were hosts New South Wales, Queensland, South Australia, defending champions Victoria and Western Australia. The series was won by the New South Wales for their eighth Shield title.

Results

References

1955 in baseball
1955 in Australian sport
1955
July 1955 sports events in Australia
August 1955 sports events in Australia